The Crane Building is an historic building in Portland, Oregon. Completed in 1909, the structure is part of the Portland Thirteenth Avenue Historic District, which is listed on the National Register of Historic Places.

External links
 

1909 establishments in Oregon
Buildings and structures completed in 1909
Buildings and structures in Portland, Oregon
Pearl District, Portland, Oregon